Pa Sefid (also Romanized as Pā Sefīd; also known as Pā Sefīdān) is a village in Hur Rural District, in the Central District of Faryab County, Kerman Province, Iran. At the 2006 census, its population was 504, in 107 families.

References 

Populated places in Faryab County